Selfishness refers to taking interest in oneself.

Selfish may also refer to:

Music
 Selfish (rapper), American rapper
 "Selfish" (Asia Cruise song), 2008
 "Selfish" (Future song), 2017
 "Selfish" (Jessica Mauboy song), 2019
 "Selfish" (Madison Beer song), 2020
 "Selfish" (PnB Rock song), 2016
 "Selfish", a 2011 song by Britney Spears from Femme Fatale
 "Selfish", a 2001 song by NSYNC from Celebrity
 "Selfish", a 1993 song by The Other Two from The Other Two & You
 "Selfish", a 2005 song by Two Hours Traffic from their self-titled debut album
 "(She's So) Selfish", a 1979 song by The Knack

Other uses
 "Selfish" (House), a 2010 episode of the TV series House
 Selfish (book), a 2015 photobook by Kim Kardashian

See also 
 
 Shellfish